Bon Pas (Creole: Bompa) is a village in the Tiburon commune of the Chardonnières Arrondissement, in the Sud department of Haiti.

See also
Carrefour Gros Chaudiere
Conete
Dalmate
Galette Sèche
Perion
Plansinte  
Tiburon

References

Populated places in Sud (department)